Resmi Sateesh is a playback singer and actor from Kerala predominantly known for her songs in the Malayalam films. She has also acted in the movie 22 Female Kottayam and worked as location sound recordist for the movie 'Makaramanju' directed by Lenin Rajendran.

Early life and education 

Born in Parassala, Reshmi studied classical music from the age of six under the tutelage of Muthiah Bhagavathar from Tamil Nadu after her music studies under Alleppey Sreekumar. She has also studied "Audiography" at the Satyajit Ray Film & Television Institute in Calcutta. She holds B.Sc. in physics masters in Social Work from the University of Calicut. She is also known for her stage performance and has performed at several international events including Kochi-Muziris Biennale

Discography

Singles 

 Ini Varunnoru Thalamurakk
 Thok Tholkum Kalam

References

External links 

Year of birth missing (living people)
Living people
Malayalam playback singers